Churatta is a town and union council of Dera Ghazi Khan District in the Punjab province of Pakistan. It is located at 30°4'0N 70°39'5E and has an altitude of 117 metres (387 feet).

References

Populated places in Dera Ghazi Khan District
Union councils of Dera Ghazi Khan District
Cities and towns in Punjab, Pakistan